The women's 100 metres hurdles event at the 2002 Asian Athletics Championships was held in Colombo, Sri Lanka on 10–12 August.

Medalists

Results

Heats
Wind:Heat 1: +0.4 m/s, Heat 2: 0.0 m/s

Final
Wind: +2.1 m/s

References

2002 Asian Athletics Championships
Sprint hurdles at the Asian Athletics Championships
2002 in women's athletics